Sung-bin or Seong-bin is a Korean masculine given name. The meaning differs based on the hanja used to write each syllable of the name. There are 27 hanja with the reading "Sung" and 25 hanja with the reading "Bin" on the South Korean government's official list of hanja which may be registered for use in given names.

People with this name include:

 An Sung-bin (born 1988), South Korean football player
 Yun Sung-bin (born 1994), South Korean skeleton racer
 Beenzino (born Lim Sung-bin, 1987), South Korean rapper

See also
 List of Korean given names

References

Korean masculine given names